This is a list of notable people who died as a result of injuries sustained during a volcanic eruption.

See also
 List of volcanic eruptions by death toll
 Lists of people by cause of death
 Volcano

References

Volcano